Dashti County is in Bushehr province, Iran. The capital of the county is the city of Khormoj. At the 2006 census, the county's population was 71,285 in 15,465 households. The following census in 2011 counted 77,530 people in 19,697 households. At the 2016 census, the county's population was 86,319 in 24,474 households. The people are Muslim and speak various forms of Persian languages, including Farsi and the local Dashti.

Dashti County is bounded by the Persian Gulf to the west, Tangestan County to the north and west, Dashtestan County to the northeast, Dayyer County and Kangan County and to the south, Jam County to the southeast, and Firuzabad County to the east.

Dashti County has a 25 km coastline along the Persian Gulf, with a climate that is mostly arid or semiarid. The highest point in the county is Mount Beyrami at 1,950 m. Petroleum, natural gas, lime, and stone from quarries are extracted in the county. Wheat, tomatoes, corn, and other grains are grown.  There is a local honey industry.

Administrative divisions

The population history and structural changes of Dashti County's administrative divisions over three consecutive censuses are shown in the following table. The latest census shows three districts, seven rural districts, and four cities.

Tourist attractions
Khormooj fortress
Dokhtar fortress, located in Lavar-e saheli village
Darab khan fortress, located in Shonbeh village
Bahman dan fortress, located in Kaki city
Mond temple
Shirine building
Mond River
Mount Beyremi
Mir Aram tomb
Seyyed Mohammad Amin tomb, located in Kaki city
Pir hashem tomb, located in Jabri village
Shahzade Mohammad tomb, located in Sheikhyan village
Dike Dojhtar, located in the Kaki city
Baghan village
Laver-e sharqi village

2013 Dashti County earthquake

A strong earthquake measuring 6.1 on the Richter scale struck the town of Shonbeh and villages of Shonbeh and Tasuj District in Dashti County on 9 April 2013, killing at least thirty-seven people.

References

 

Counties of Bushehr Province